The women's 10 metre air rifle competition at the 2004 Summer Olympics was held on August 14 at the Markópoulo Olympic Shooting Centre near Athens, Greece. Following a relatively new Olympic tradition, it was the first event to be concluded at these Games.

The event consisted of two rounds: a qualifier and a final. In the qualifier, each shooter fired 40 shots with an air rifle at 10 metres distance from the standing position. Scores for each shot were in increments of 1, with a maximum score of 10.

The top 8 shooters in the qualifying round moved on to the final round. There, they fired an additional 10 shots. These shots scored in increments of .1, with a maximum score of 10.9. The total score from all 50 shots was used to determine final ranking.

China's world record holder Du Li outscored a host of elite markswomen in the air rifle shooting final to notch the first gold medal at these Games, smashing a new Olympic record score of 502.0 points. Russia's Lioubov Galkina, who led the field by a full point into the final with 399, had to settle for the silver with a total score of 501.5 points, while Czech Republic's Kateřina Kůrková held off a daunting challenge from Zhao Yinghui (500.8) to rule out the Chinese supremacy in the medal haul for a bronze at 501.1, falling Zhao to a disappointing fourth by a 0.3-point deficit.

Records
Prior to this competition, the existing world and Olympic records were as follows.

Qualification round

Final

References

External links
Official Results

Women's 10 m Air Rifle
Olymp
Women's events at the 2004 Summer Olympics